The 1947–48 Iowa State Cyclones men's basketball team represented Iowa State University during the 1947-48 NCAA men's basketball season. The Cyclones were coached by Clay Sutherland, who was in his first season with the Cyclones. They played their home games at the Iowa State Armory in Ames, Iowa.

They finished the season 14–9, 6–6 in Big Six play to finish in fourth place.

Roster

Schedule and results 

|-
!colspan=6 style=""|Regular Season

|-

References 

Iowa State Cyclones men's basketball seasons
Iowa State
Iowa State Cyc
Iowa State Cyc